Wilfred Baddeley defeated Joshua Pim 6–4, 1–6, 7–5, 6–0 in the all comers' final to win the gentlemen's singles tennis title at the 1891 Wimbledon Championships. The reigning champion, Willoughby Hamilton, did not defend his title.

Draw

All comers' finals

Top half

Bottom half

References

External links

Gentlemen's Singles
Wimbledon Championship by year – Men's singles